Namirea is a genus of Australian spiders in the family Euagridae. It was first described by Robert Raven in 1984.

Species
 it contains the following species:
Namirea dougwallacei Raven, 1993 – Australia (Queensland)
Namirea eungella Raven, 1984 – Australia (Queensland)
Namirea fallax Raven, 1984 – Australia (New South Wales)
Namirea insularis Raven, 1984 – Australia (Queensland)
Namirea johnlyonsi Raven, 1993 – Australia (Queensland)
Namirea montislewisi Raven, 1984 – Australia (Queensland)
Namirea planipes Raven, 1984 (type) – Australia (Queensland)

References

Euagridae
Mygalomorphae genera